Colombo Stars, formerly known as Colombo Kings, is a franchise Twenty20 cricket team based in Colombo, Sri Lanka, that competes in the Lanka Premier League. Ashoka Pathirage, a Sri Lankan businessman, owns the team. The team was supposed to be coached by former Australian cricketer Dav Whatmore. However he pulled out ahead of the 2020 Lanka Premier League due to personal reasons and was replaced by former English cricketer Kabir Ali. Kabir Ali was again replaced by Herschelle Gibbs after he tested positive for COVID-19. Angelo Mathews was announced as the icon player and Andre Russell was named as the marquee foreign player.

In June 2021, Sri Lanka Cricket (SLC) terminated the franchise ahead of the 2021 Lanka Premier League, due to financial issues. In November 2021, the team changed its name to Colombo Stars after changing owners.

Seasons

Sponsors

Current squad
 Players with international caps are listed in bold.
  denotes a player who is currently unavailable for selection.
  denotes a player who is unavailable for rest of the season.

Administration and support staff

Captains

Source: ESPNcricinfo, Last updated: 20 Dec 2021

Former players

Statistics

Most runs 

Source: ESPNcricinfo, Last updated: 20  Dec 2021

Most wickets 

Source: ESPNcricinfo, Last Updated:20  Dec 2021

By season

 Last updated: 18 December 2020
 Source :ESPNcricinfo

By opposition

 Last updated: 24 December 2021
 Source :ESPNcricinfo

See also
 Colombo Kings in 2020
 Colombo Stars in 2021
 Colombo Stars in 2022

References

2020 establishments in Sri Lanka
Colombo Stars
Cricket in Colombo
Cricket clubs established in 2020
Lanka Premier League teams